The 2005 Saint Louis mayoral election was held on April 5, 2005 to elect the mayor of St. Louis, Missouri. It saw the reelection of incumbent mayor Francis Slay to a second term.

The election was preceded by party primaries on March 8.

Democratic primary 
Incumbent mayor Francis Slay was challenged for renomination by alderman Irene J. Smith as well as by Bill Haas.

Green primary

General election

References

Mayoral elections in St. Louis
St. Louis
St. Louis
2000s in St. Louis
St. Louis